The Costa Rica national football team has represented Costa Rica in international football since 1921, when they played their first international, a 7–0 win over El Salvador in the Independence Centenary Games. Organized by the Costa Rican Football Federation, it joined FIFA in 1927 and CONCACAF in 1961.

Players

References

 
Costa Rica
Association football player non-biographical articles